Albert Bowden (28 September 1874 – 8 August 1943) was an Australian cricketer. He played eleven first-class matches for New South Wales between 1899/1900 and 1907/08.

See also
 List of New South Wales representative cricketers

References

External links
 

1874 births
1943 deaths
Australian cricketers
New South Wales cricketers
Cricketers from Sydney